Perfect is the second EP by punk rock trio Mannequin Pussy, released through Epitaph Records in May 2021. It sees Will Yip returning as producer and engineer after working on their 2019 album Patience.

Composition
Perfect sees the trio working in "swooning" balladry, "glistening" pop rock and "scathing" punk rock. It also works in pop-punk like that on Patience.

Critical reception

Perfect received acclaim from music critics. On Metacritic, it holds a score of 80 out of 100, indicating "generally favorable reviews", based on six reviews.

Track listing

Personnel
All credits adapted from the EP's Bandcamp page.

Mannequin Pussy
 Marisa "Missy" Dabice – vocals, guitars (rhythm and lead), synths 
 Kaleen Reading – drums and percussion 
 Colins "Bear" Regisford – bass, vocals 
 Thanasi Paul – guitar (rhythm and lead), piano 

Additional musicians 
 Desiree Dabice – harmonies 
 Will Yip – drum production   

Technical 
 Will Yip – engineering, production 
 Grave Goods – additional production, sounds

References

2021 EPs
Epitaph Records EPs
Punk rock EPs